Vasileos Konstantinos Avenue, Leoforos Vasileos Konstantinou, "King Constantine Avenue") is one of Athens' major thoroughfares running from the Panathinaiko Stadium (also known as the Kalimarmaro Stadium) at Herodou Attikou Street to the Hilton Athens on Vasilissis Sofias Avenue. It is a divided road with two lanes in each direction.  The street is named after King Constantine I of Greece, who was King in 1913–1917 and again in 1920–1922.

Famous buildings on the street are the aforementioned Stadium, the National Gallery of Art and the Athens Hilton Hotel.

History

The modern street was first built in the mid-19th century.  The street was later paved. Streetcars and trolleys were added in the 20th century and the street was two-way.  There are a number of apartment buildings and parks along the entire length of the street

Intersections

 Herodou Attikou Street
 Eratosthenous Street
 Skouze Square/Pafsaniou Street
 Leoforos Vasileos Georgiou B′
 Rizari Street
 Vasilissis Sofias Avenue
 [ Asseliah Squinn Avenue ]]

External links

Shopping districts and streets in Greece
Streets in Athens